Sir George Warburton Fuller  (22 January 1861 – 22 July 1940) was an Australian politician who served as the 22nd Premier of New South Wales, in office from 1922 to 1925 and for one day in December 1921. He previously served in the federal House of Representatives from 1901 to 1913, representing the Division of Illawarra, and was Minister for Home Affairs under Alfred Deakin from 1909 to 1910.

Early life
Fuller was born in Kiama, New South Wales. He was the son of George Lawrence Fuller. He was educated at Kiama Public School, Sydney Grammar School and at St Andrew's College at the University of Sydney. He received a Bachelor of Arts (Hons) in 1879, and a Master of Arts in 1882 from the University of Sydney. He studied law under Sir William Patrick Manning (eminent judge and university chancellor) and became a barrister in 1884.

Colonial politics
Fuller served in the New South Wales Legislative Assembly for over 18 years. Initially he represented Kiama from 1889 to 1894, but was defeated in 1894 and again in 1898.

Federal politics

Fuller was the first member for Illawarra in the new Australian House of Representatives between 1901 and 1913. He was Minister for Home Affairs in 1909 and 1910 in Alfred Deakin's Commonwealth Liberal Party government and was responsible for making Canberra the national capital. In 1911 he was an Australian representative at the coronation of George V.

State politics
From 1915 to 1928 Fuller represented Wollondilly for the Liberal Party and, from 1916, the Nationalist Party. In the part of 1916 and 1917, he was a leader of New South Wales' Nationalist Party and he became Colonial Secretary (the second most important cabinet position) in 1916. 

In 1917, his heavy-handed handling of a strike by rail and tramway workers against the introduction of time cards antagonised the unions and led to a general strike. His promise of higher pay and improved seniority benefits to workers returning to work split the rail unions for most of the twentieth century and the different employment conditions lasted until the Lang Government was elected. His action was seen by supporters as the decisive leadership required in wartime. In 1919, he expanded the state-owned fishing trawler fleet "to provide cheap fish for the mass of the population". 

On 3 June 1919, he was appointed as a Knight Commander of the Order of St Michael and St George for his service as Colonial Secretary.

Premier

Labor won the 1920 election and Fuller became Leader of the Opposition. In 1921 he took advantage of the death of John Storey to defeat James Dooley's Government on a motion of no confidence and as a result was asked to form a government. But Fuller himself had to give up the Premiership after only seven hours, after losing another motion of no confidence and Dooley returned to office. 

In the 1922 state election, Dooley was defeated and Fuller became Premier once again. His government began the construction of the Sydney Harbour Bridge. This time his tenure lasted till the 1925 state election, won by Labor's Jack Lang.

Later years
Shortly after Lang's victory, Fuller resigned from the Nationalist leadership in favour of Thomas Bavin. From 1928 to 1931 he was the state's Agent-General in London. He died in the Sydney suburb of Darlinghurst.

References

1861 births
1940 deaths
People educated at Sydney Grammar School
University of Sydney alumni
Members of the Australian House of Representatives for Illawarra
Members of the Australian House of Representatives
Members of the Cabinet of Australia
Free Trade Party members of the Parliament of Australia
Commonwealth Liberal Party members of the Parliament of Australia
Australian federationists
Nationalist Party of Australia members of the Parliament of New South Wales
Australian Knights Commander of the Order of St Michael and St George
Australian politicians awarded knighthoods
Premiers of New South Wales
Members of the New South Wales Legislative Assembly
Agents-General for New South Wales
Leaders of the Opposition in New South Wales
Treasurers of New South Wales
20th-century Australian politicians